The 10th TVyNovelas Awards is an Academy of special awards to the best soap operas and TV shows. The awards ceremony took place on 1992 in Mexico City. The ceremony was televised in Mexico by El Canal de las Estrellas.

Raúl Velasco hosted the show. Cadenas de amargura won 8 awards including Best Telenovela, the most for the evening. Other winners La pícara soñadora won 3 awards, Milagro y magia and Muchachitas won 2 awards and Alcanzar una estrella II, Al filo de la muerte and En carne propia won 1 each.

Summary of awards and nominations

Winners and nominees

Telenovelas

Others

Special Awards 
 Current Career for 60 Years: Marga López
 Musical Career: Vicente Fernández
 Recognition Singer with the Greatest Projection International Career: Yuri
 The Most Beautiful Hair: Bibi Gaytán & Ricky Martin

National Segment 
This award segment to favorites, among them are:
 The Most Beautiful Legs of Mexican Show Business: Lucero.

References 

TVyNovelas Awards
TVyNovelas Awards
TVyNovelas Awards
TVyNovelas Awards ceremonies